Vice-Admiral James William Rivett-Carnac CB CBE  DSC DL (12 February 1891 – 9 October 1970) was a Royal Navy officer who became Commander-in-Chief of the New Zealand Division.

Naval career
Born the younger son of Rev. Sir Clennel George Rivett-Carnac, 6th Baronet, Rivett-Carnac joined the Royal Navy in 1910 and served in World War I and was mentioned in despatches. He became Commander-in-Chief of the New Zealand Division in December 1938. He also served in World War II as Director of Training and Staff Duties at the Admiralty from April 1940 and as Commanding Officer of the battleship HMS Rodney from 1941 before becoming rear-admiral in charge of the Normandy beaches during the Allied invasion of Europe in 1944. In March 1945 he was appointed Rear-Admiral Q British Pacific Fleet until June 1945, then made acting Vice-Admiral with the new title of Vice-Admiral Q British Pacific Fleet he was responsible for organising logistical support of the BPF, including logistic activities ashore and for the ships of the Fleet Train until April 1946. He was mentioned in despatches twice during World War II. He retired in 1947.

In retirement he lived in Bury St Edmunds and became Deputy Lieutenant of Suffolk.

He is buried in the churchyard of St. Martin's parish church in Fornham St. Martin in Suffolk.

Family
He married Isla Nesta Blackwood.

References

1891 births
1970 deaths
James
Royal Navy vice admirals
Royal Navy officers of World War I
Commanders of the Order of the British Empire
Companions of the Order of the Bath
Recipients of the Distinguished Service Cross (United Kingdom)
Deputy Lieutenants of Suffolk
Younger sons of baronets
Royal Navy personnel of World War II